The Sri Lankan cricket team played a 4-match ODI series in India from 8 to 17 February 2007. India won the series 2–1.

Squads

Result

First ODI

Second ODI

Third ODI

Fourth ODI

References

External links
 Tour home at ESPN Cricinfo

2007 in Indian cricket
2007 in Sri Lankan cricket
Indian cricket seasons from 2000–01
International cricket competitions in 2006–07
2007